Henry M. Summers served as acting mayor of New Orleans from 5 June to 21 June, 1858, having been appointed following the impeachment and removal from office of Mayor Charles M. Waterman. 

Summers died at age 52 on 23 June 1865.

References
 Administrations of the Mayors of New Orleans, Charles M. Waterman, Louisiana Division, New Orleans Public Library 

Year of birth missing
1865 deaths
Mayors of New Orleans